Big Chimney is a  census-designated place (CDP) located on U.S. Route 119 in Kanawha County, West Virginia, United States. As of the 2010 census, its population was 627. It is accessible by West Virginia Route 114 or exit 5 from I-79.  The center of town includes a Hardee's, a drug store, hardware store and grocery store, along with a few smaller businesses. The town is named after the tall chimney of the local salt works, which was a prominent landmark.

References 

Census-designated places in Kanawha County, West Virginia
Census-designated places in West Virginia
Charleston, West Virginia metropolitan area